Saint Jeremias I, (? – 13 January 1546) was Ecumenical Patriarch of Constantinople two times, from 1522 to 1524 and from 1525 to 1546.

Life
St. Jeremias was a native of Zitsa in Epirus, and was raised without instruction. He became Archbishop of Sofia on or before 1513. On the 31 December 1522 he became Patriarch of Constantinople.

Shortly after his election, he travelled to Cyprus, Egypt, Sinai and Palestine. During his stay in Jerusalem, the clergy and the notables of Constantinople deposed him on April or May 1524, and elected in his place the Metropolitan of Sozopolis, Joannicius I. Jeremias reacted and together with the Patriarchs of Alexandria and Antioch whom he called to Jerusalem, he excommunicated Joannicius. He was restored in Constantinople on 24 September 1525.

In 1537 Jeremias obtained an order from the Sultan Suleiman the Magnificent to stop the conversion of churches into mosques in Constantinople, but this decision was not confirmed by Suleiman's successors. Jeremias died on 13 January 1546 in the town of Vratsa, while travelling to Wallachia.

On 10 January 2023 (N.S.), the Holy and Sacred Synod of the Ecumenical Patriarchate of Constantinople, under the presidency of His All-Holiness Ecumenical Patriarch Bartholomew, formally added Patriarch Jeremias I to the calendar of Saints of the Orthodox Church, with an annual commemoration of 13 January.

Notes

Further reading
 

15th-century births
1546 deaths
People from Ioannina (regional unit)
16th-century Greek people
16th-century Ecumenical Patriarchs of Constantinople
15th-century Christian saints
16th-century Christian saints
Greek saints of the Eastern Orthodox Church
Eastern Orthodox saints
Saints from Constantinople